Anina Fivian (born 25 March 1981) is a Swiss former competitive figure skater. She is a two-time Swiss national champion and reached the free skate at three ISU Championships – 1997 Europeans in Paris, 1997 Junior Worlds in Seoul, and 1998 Junior Worlds in Saint John, New Brunswick.

Fivian was coached by Karlheinz Zitterbart and belonged to Eislauf-Club Thun. After retiring from competition, she performed in ice shows and then became a police officer.

Programs

Competitive highlights 
JGP: Junior Series (Junior Grand Prix)

References 

1981 births
Swiss female single skaters
Living people
People from Thun
Place of birth missing (living people)
Sportspeople from the canton of Bern